Nymphicula hexaxantha is a moth in the family Crambidae. It was described by David John Lawrence Agassiz in 2012. It is found in the Republic of the Congo, Kenya, Malawi, South Africa, Tanzania, Uganda, Zambia and Zimbabwe.

The wingspan is 10–12 mm. The forewings are white, with a fuscous costa and an ochreous subbasal area. The hindwings have an ochreous subbasal fascia. The medial area is scattered with dark brown scales.

Etymology
The species name refers to the bold ochreous markings of the forewing.

References

Nymphicula
Moths described in 2012